Following are the statistics of the Danish Championship League in the 1936–37 season.

Overview
It was contested by 10 teams, and Akademisk Boldklub won the championship.

League standings

References
Denmark - List of final tables (RSSSF)

Top level Danish football league seasons
Den
1936–37 in Danish football